The Autism – Tics, AD/HD, and other Comorbidities (A–TAC) is a psychological measure used to screen for other conditions occurring with tics. Along with tic disorders, it screens for autism spectrum disorders, attention deficit/hyperactivity disorder (ADHD) and other conditions with onset in childhood. The A-TAC has been reported as valid and reliable for detecting most disorders in children. One telephone survey found it was not validated for eating disorders.

Developed at the University of Gothenburg by Christopher Gillberg and colleagues, A–TAC is organized into twenty modules. The 96 questions cover a range of child psychiatric topics. The A–TAC can be done as a clinical telephone interview and is also available in multiple languages on the Swedish Child Neuropsychiatry Science Foundation. Questions include "almost verbatim" the characteristics listed in the DSM-IV diagnostic definitions of disorders for several conditions.

References 

Screening and assessment tools in child and adolescent psychiatry
Autism screening and assessment tools
Tourette syndrome